The Integrated Transport Information System (ITIS) is a traffic management system in Klang Valley, Malaysia. The system began operation on 2005 with the cooperation of Kuala Lumpur City Hall (DBKL), Malaysian Highway Authority, Malaysian Public Works Department (JKR) and the Ministry of Transport Malaysia. The system is used for traffic monitoring, accident, construction and other situations that happen on the roads and highways in Kuala Lumpur and Klang Valley. The main ITIS headquarters and traffic operation centre is located at Bukit Jalil Highway near Technology Park Malaysia in Bukit Jalil.

Mechanism 
The ITIS is a system made up of two core components, which are Advance Traffic Management System (ATMS) and Advance Travellers Information System (ATIS).

Advance Traffic Management System 
The ATMS acts as the eyes and ears of the ITIS where all traffic information are collected. The ATMS is made up of data collection units, which are CCTVs, Automatic Incident Detection System (AID System) and Automatic Vehicle Location System (AVLS). The data collection units relays the data to Transport Management Center (TMC) in Bukit Jalil for analysis and processing.

Automatic Incident Detection System
One of its components, Automatic Incident Detection System, is capable to detect incidents happening around the coverage area. The Automatic Incident Detection system relies on video image processing to calculate the average speed, count, occupancy etc. of each lane of travel. The data from these detectors forms the basis for the development of the congestion map which relate flow speed and occupancy over a specific road link. Intelligent image processing enables the detectors to automatically alert operators of prescribed incidents such as stopped vehicles and reverse flows.

Automatic Vehicle Location System
AVLS encompasses vehicles which are fitted with global positioning system tracking devices that allow these vehicles to be tracked 24-hours a day. These vehicles are used as traffic probes and the data collected is used to build speed profiles for a road network. The speed profiles are to be used to develop congestion maps for medium to long-term transport planning and for traffic engineering purposes.

Advance Traveller Information System 
The Advanced Traveller Information System (ATIS) delivers real-time information of the traffic conditions to the public so that the congestion in the city would be reduced. The data are disseminated via Variable Message Signs (VMS), radio stations, the Internet and the ITIS Call Centre.

ITIS in enforcement 
There are widespread of criticisms citing that the ITIS is a white elephant. In 2007, the Ministry of Transport Malaysia implemented the Automated Enforcement System (AES). However, the highly sophisticated ITIS is not part of the AES.

See also 
Malaysian expressway system
Malaysian Federal Roads system
Road signs in Malaysia
Automated Enforcement System
Intelligent Transportation System

External links 
 ITIS Homepage Official Website

2005 establishments in Malaysia
Transport in Malaysia